Hear My Music is a posthumous compilation album by Jimi Hendrix, released on November 30, 2004 by Dagger Records. The album contains instrumental studio jams and demos recorded in early 1969.

Track listing
All songs were written by Jimi Hendrix, except where noted.

Personnel
Jimi Hendrix – guitar, piano on track 11
Noel Redding – bass on tracks 1, 3 and 10, 8-string bass on track 6
Mitch Mitchell – drums on tracks 1, 3-6 and 10
Billy Cox – bass on tracks 2 and 5
Rocky Isaac – drums on track 2
Al Marks – percussion on track 2
Roland Robinson – bass on track 4
Jim McCarty – guitar on track 4
Sharon Layne – piano on track 5

References

Compilation albums published posthumously
Jimi Hendrix compilation albums
2004 compilation albums
Dagger Records compilation albums